The Wakefield Documentary Film Festival is an annual film festival in Wakefield, Quebec, which stages a program of documentary films. The festival is staged each February at the Wakefield Centre, screening films every weekend throughout the month.

In conjunction with a 2018 screening of the documentary film California Typewriter, Ottawa resident Stephen Hendrie hosted an exhibition of his own collection of vintage typewriters.

References

External links

Film festivals in Quebec
Documentary film festivals in Canada